Barsby is a village and former civil parish now in the parish of Gaddesby, in the Melton district, in the county of Leicestershire, England. In 1931 the parish had a population of 162. The surname derives from the village.

History 
The village's name means 'farm/settlement of Barn' or 'farm/settlement of the children/offspring'. Barsby was recorded in the Domesday Book as Barnesbie. Barsby was a chapelry in Ashby-Folville parish in 1866 Barsby became a civil parish in its own right, on 24 March 1884 Ashby Newbould was transferred from Ashby Folville and areas were moved to and from South Croxton. On 1 April 1936 the parish was abolished and merged with Gaddesby.

References

External links 
 
 

Villages in Leicestershire
Former civil parishes in Leicestershire
Borough of Melton